Dresvyanka is a rural locality (a village) in Chushevitskoye Rural Settlement, Verkhovazhsky District, Vologda Oblast, Russia. The population was 4 as of 2002.

Geography 
The distance to Verkhovazhye is 54.3 km, to Chushevitsy is 10.5 km. Kudrino, Novaya Derevnya, Mys, Zuyevskiye are the nearest rural localities.

References 

Rural localities in Verkhovazhsky District